The following is a list of breweries in British Columbia.

Breweries

Defunct

See also
 Beer in Canada
 List of breweries in Canada

References

 
Breweries_in_British_Columbia
Breweries

British Columbia